The Kodak CX4230 is a model of digital camera produced by the Eastman Kodak Company.  It is part of the company's EasyShare consumer line of cameras, and is compatible with the Kodak camera docks and printer docks.  Its CCD image sensor gives a 2 megapixel image, while the fully retractable KODAK RETINAR lens has a focal length range equivalent to 36 mm–108 mm on a 35 mm film camera (3× optical zoom).

CX4230